Brian William Barclay (27 February 1938 – 26 April 2020) was an Australian rules footballer who played with Fitzroy in the Victorian Football League (VFL).

Notes

External links 
		

2020 deaths
1938 births
Australian rules footballers from Victoria (Australia)
Fitzroy Football Club players